Georg von Békésy (3 June 1899 – 13 June 1972) was a Hungarian-American biophysicist.

By using strobe photography and silver flakes as a marker, he was able to observe that the basilar membrane moves like a surface wave when stimulated by sound. Because of the structure of the cochlea and the basilar membrane, different frequencies of sound cause the maximum amplitudes of the waves to occur at different places on the basilar membrane along the coil of the cochlea. High frequencies cause more vibration at the base of the cochlea while low frequencies create more vibration at the apex.

He concluded that his observations showed how different sound wave frequencies are locally dispersed before exciting different nerve fibers that lead from the cochlea to the brain.

In 1961, he was awarded the Nobel Prize in Physiology or Medicine for his research on the function of the cochlea in the mammalian hearing organ.

Biography
Békésy was born on 3 June 1899 in Budapest, Hungary, as the first of three children (György 1899, Lola 1901 and Miklós 1903) to Sándor Békésy (1860–1923), an economic diplomat, and to his mother Paula Mazaly.

The Békésy family was originally Reformed but converted to Catholicism. His mother, Paula (1877–1974) was born in Čađavica, Kingdom of Croatia-Slavonia, part of Austria-Hungary (now Croatia). His maternal grandfather was from Pécs. His father was born in Kolozsvár (now Cluj-Napoca, Romania).

Békésy went to school in Budapest, Munich, and Zürich. He studied chemistry in Bern and received his PhD in physics on the subject: "Fast way of determining molecular weight" from the University of Budapest in 1926.

He then spent one year working in an engineering firm. He published his first paper on the pattern of vibrations of the inner ear in 1928. He was offered a position at Uppsala University by Róbert Bárány, which he declined because of the hard Swedish winters.

Before and during World War II, Békésy worked for the Hungarian Post Office (1923 to 1946), where he did research on telecommunications signal quality. This research led him to become interested in the workings of the ear. In 1946, he left Hungary to follow this line of research at the Karolinska Institute in Sweden.

In 1947, he moved to the United States, working at Harvard University until 1966. In 1962 he was elected a Member of the German Academy of Sciences Leopoldina. After his lab was destroyed by fire in 1965, he was invited to lead a research laboratory of sense organs in Honolulu, Hawaii.  He became a professor at the University of Hawaii in 1966 and died in Honolulu.

He became a well-known expert in Asian art. He had a large collection which he donated to the Nobel Foundation in Sweden. His brother, Dr. Miklós Békésy (1903-1980), stayed in Hungary and became a famous agrobiologist who was awarded the Kossuth Prize.

Research
Békésy contributed most notably to our understanding of the mechanism by which sound frequencies are registered in the inner ear. He developed a method for dissecting the inner ear of human cadavers while leaving the cochlea partly intact. By using strobe photography and silver flakes as a marker, he was able to observe that the basilar membrane moves like a surface wave when stimulated by sound. Because of the structure of the cochlea and the basilar membrane, different frequencies of sound cause the maximum amplitudes of the waves to occur at different places on the basilar membrane along the coil of the cochlea. High frequencies cause more vibration at the base of the cochlea while low frequencies create more vibration at the apex.

Békésy concluded from these observations that by exciting different locations on the basilar membrane different sound wave frequencies excite different nerve fibers that lead from the cochlea to the brain. He theorized that, due to its placement along the cochlea, each sensory cell (hair cell) responds maximally to a specific frequency of sound (the so-called tonotopy). Békésy later developed a mechanical model of the cochlea, which confirmed the concept of frequency dispersion by the basilar membrane in the mammalian cochlea.

In an article published posthumously in 1974, Békésy reviewed progress in the field, remarking "In time, I came to the conclusion that the dehydrated cats and the application of Fourier analysis to hearing problems became more and more a handicap for research in hearing," referring to the difficulties in getting animal preparations to behave as when alive, and the misleading common interpretations of Fourier analysis in hearing research.

Ancestry

Awards
Békésy's honours include:
The Denker Prize in Otology (1931), The Leibniz Medal of the Berlin Academy of Sciences (1937), The Guyot Prize for Speech and Otology of Groningen University (1939), The Academy Award of the Budapest Academy of Science (1946), Shambough Prize in Otology (1950).
Honorary doctorates (M.D.) were conferred on him by the University of Munster (1955), Bern (1959), Padua (1962), Buenos Aires (1968), Cordoba (1968), Hawaii (1969) and Semmelweiss University, Budapest (1969).

References

Further reading

External links

  including the Nobel Lecture, December 11, 1961 Concerning the Pleasures of Observing, and the Mechanics of the Inner Ear
 Georg von Békésy page at the Pacific Biosciences Research Center
 Békésy Laboratory of Neurobiology website
 Békésy art collection
 My experiences in different laboratories, autobiographical speech by von Békésy
 The Ear Pages game

1899 births
1972 deaths
Scientists from Budapest
Austrian untitled nobility
Harvard University faculty
History of neuroscience
Hungarian biophysicists
Hungarian neuroscientists
Hungarian Nobel laureates
Austro-Hungarian Nobel laureates
Hungarian nobility
20th-century Hungarian physicists
Hungarian emigrants to the United States
Members of the Hungarian Academy of Sciences
Nobel laureates in Physiology or Medicine
University of Hawaiʻi faculty
Members of the German Academy of Sciences Leopoldina
ASA Gold Medal recipients
Members of the United States National Academy of Sciences
University of Bern alumni